The Fireflies is a country pop music trio consisting of Henriette Andersen, Julia Fabrin Jakobsen, and Mathilde Christensen. The band was formed by Soulshock, a Danish record producer and songwriter, to compete in the third season of the Danish version of The X Factor. They reached the semi-finals, but were eliminated when they failed to receive enough votes from the Danish public.

Performances during X Factor

Discography

Albums

Singles

References

External links 

Danish pop music groups
X Factor (Danish TV series) contestants